The Latvian identity card, also known as Personal certificate, is an officially recognised biometric identity document issued to Latvian citizens.  They are also valid for travel within Europe (except Belarus, Russia, Ukraine and the United Kingdom), Georgia, French Overseas territories and Montserrat (max. 14 days) (without the need for a Latvian passport).

Until 2023, when the card will become mandatory for most, Latvian citizens who hold a valid passport are not obliged to obtain an ID card. The card is mandatory if a citizen over the age of 15 does not have a passport.

See also

National identity cards in the European Union
Latvian passport
Identity document

References

External links
PERSONAL CERTIFICATES (EID CARD), The Office of Citizenship and Migration Affairs

Documents
Latvia